The Messerschmitt Me 334 was a proposed German piston-engined fighter, designed by Alexander Lippisch. No examples were built.

Design and development
Alexander Lippisch was noted for designing tailless aircraft, with a certain amount of success. Along similar lines as the rocket-powered Me 163, Lippisch designed a tailless fighter to be powered by a Heinkel turbojet. The slow pace of development of reliable turbojets forced Lippisch to redesign the aircraft to be powered by a single Daimler-Benz DB 605 inverted V-12 piston engine, mounted in the nose and driving a pusher propeller at the rear of the fuselage pod, via an extension shaft.

The mid-mounted wings would have been swept back 23.4°, housing the skinny retractable main landing gear with elevons inboard and ailerons outboard on the trailing edge. Slots in the outboard leading edges would have improved slow speed performance and handling.

The intended armament of two  MG 131 machine guns was to have been housed in the wing roots. Designated Me 334 by the Reichsluftfahrtministerium (RLM), development was abandoned by Lippisch with the advent of the Lippisch P.20.

Specifications

References

External links

 Me 334 with 3-view
 Emmanuel Gustin's aircraft background notes

1940s German experimental aircraft
1940s German fighter aircraft
Me 334
Single-engined pusher aircraft